Khiarzar (also Romanized as Khīārzār, Khīār Zār, and Khīyar Zar; also known as Kheyār Zard) is a village in Shabankareh Rural District, Shabankareh District, Dashtestan County, Bushehr Province, Iran. At the 2006 census, its population was 375, in 78 families.

References 

Populated places in Dashtestan County